Praspel (PHP Realistic Annotation and Specification Language) is a formal specification language for PHP. It is based on the design-by-contract paradigm and uses preconditions, postconditions, invariants etc. Specifications are written in the comments of the PHP code (always accessible). Praspel is used for manual or automatic software validation and verification, thanks to realistic domains.

Bibliography 

PHP